Basilica  di Sant'Andrea can refer to:

Basilica  di Sant'Andrea, monastery in Vercelli, Piedmont, northern Italy
Basilica  di Sant'Andrea  di Mantova, Renaissance church in Mantua, Lombardy Italy
Sant'Andrea  della Valle (Basilica  di Sant'Andrea  della Valle), a basilica church in Rome, Italy

See also
St. Andrew's Basilica, Arthunkal in Arthunkal
Basilica  of St. Andrew the Apostle
Saint Andrew of Patras, Greek Orthodox basilica